The 1891 Army Cadets football team represented the United States Military Academy in the 1891 college football season. In the first full season of Army football (Army had played a single game in 1890), the Cadets compiled a 4–1–1 record and outscored their opponents by a combined total of 80 to 73.  The Cadets opened the season with a 10–6 victory over Fordham, the team's first-ever win. In the final game of the season, the Cadets defeated the Midshipmen by 32–16 in the second annual Army–Navy Game.

Army's head coach in 1891 was 22-year-old Henry L. Williams, who had played football at Yale.  Williams remained at the academy only one year.  He later served as head coach at Minnesota for 22 years and was inducted into the College Football Hall of Fame.

No Army Cadets were honored on the 1891 College Football All-America Team.

Schedule

Players
 Harry H. Pattison 
 Sterling P. Adams, center 
 Butler Ames 
 Elmer W. Clark, right guard
 Peter W. Davidson, left halfback 
 Willard E. Gleason, left guard
 George E. Houle, left tackle
 Dennis Michie, fullback
 James T. Moore, left end
 Leonard M. Prince, right end 
 Fine W. Smith, right tackle
 Edward J. Timberlake, right halfback 
 Kirby Walker, quarterback
 Frank A. Wilcox

References

Army
Army Black Knights football seasons
Army Cadets football